The March 2021 North American blizzard was a record-breaking blizzard in the Rocky Mountains and a significant snowstorm in the Upper Midwest that occurred in mid-March of 2021. It brought Cheyenne, Wyoming their largest two-day snowfall on record, and Denver, Colorado their second-largest March snowfall on record. The storm originated from an extratropical cyclone in the northern Pacific Ocean in early March, arriving on the west coast of the United States by March 10. It was unofficially given the name Winter Storm Xylia. 

Thousands lost power and several areas received some of their heaviest late-season snowfall on record. The system caused at least $75 million in damage, although no fatalities were reported. The system was also responsible for a tornado outbreak in the Texas Panhandle on March 13, spawning 21 confirmed tornadoes. These tornadoes caused $1.285 million in damage.

Meteorological history 
On March 4, a new extratropical low formed over the north central Pacific, within a larger extratropical storm. On the next day, the storm slowly began to approach the West Coast, while developing multiple central lows in the process. On March 10, the storm began moving ashore in California, while developing a new low-pressure center to the east, which became the dominant low by the next day, after the storm had moved inland. The storm remained nearly stationary over the Western United States for another day, before resuming its eastward motion on March 12, as a disorganized storm system. On the next day, the storm began approaching another system over the Central Plains while gradually strengthening, before merging with it early on March 14, with the winter storm organizing significantly and growing more powerful in the process. On the night of March 13–14, a powerful low-level jet stream channeled large amounts of moisture from the Gulf of Mexico across the Southern Plains and into the storm, which enhanced precipitation from the storm and also contributed to the strengthening of the system. On March 14, the winter storm developed a secondary low at the triple point of its occluded front, as the storm expanded in size. For much of that day, the storm's central low remained nearly stationary, even as it was intensifying. The storm's cyclogenesis resulted in a tightening of the pressure gradient, which gave the storm a large and expansive wind field.

Afterward, the storm gradually began to weaken as it slowly moved eastward, even as it continued expanding in size. The storm's eastern flank continued moving farther apart from the parent low during this time. From March 14 to 15, another extratropical cyclone moving in from the Pacific Northwest helped speed up the storm's eastward motion. Throughout March 15, the winter storm weakened significantly, with the storm's western flank breaking off into a new storm over Northern United States, while the storm's secondary low to the east dissipated. On March 17, the majority of the moisture from the winter storm was absorbed into a new storm developing off the coast of the Carolinas, as the former storm's low-pressure center stalled over West Virginia. Later that day, the winter storm dissipated over West Virginia.

Preparations
Winter Storm Warnings and Blizzard Warnings were issued from March 12–13 in much of the Rocky Mountains, where the heaviest of the snowfall was expected to occur.

Rocky Mountains
In Colorado, where the winter storm had the potential to be the biggest March snowstorm since 2003, officials urged residents to prepare ahead of the storm. On March 10, as the system was moving ashore in the West Coast, the Colorado Department of Transportation (CDOT) advised motorists to stay off the roads during the peak of the storm, due to potential whiteout and blizzard conditions being possible. The city of Denver prepared to deploy snowplows ahead and during the storm to clear residential streets as needed. In addition, United Airlines offered waivers to flights expected to be impacted by the winter storm.

Governor Mark Gordon of the state of Wyoming posted a warning on Twitter on March 13, advising residents to stay off the roads at all costs during the storm. The Wyoming Department of Transportation (WYDOT) urged motorists to stay off the roads during the snow on March 12, and stated they were ready to deploy snow plows and materials to treat roadways. Blizzard warnings were later expanded southward along the Front Range to include Denver. In Sioux Falls, South Dakota, snow blew into traffic lights at intersections, making it impossible for drivers to tell if the lights were red, yellow or green.

Southern Plains
On the morning of March 13, the Storm Prediction Center issued a moderate risk severe weather outlook for the Texas Panhandle, noting the potential for strong tornadoes.

Impact

Rocky Mountains
The storm brought Cheyenne their largest two-day snowfall on record, with  falling from March 13–14. The storm closed schools and colleges, as well as city and state government buildings. Schools and government offices also shut down in Casper. Denver received their second-largest March snowfall on record, with  falling at the airport. The storm was also Denver's fourth-largest snowstorm on record. The storm shut down major highways, caused blizzard conditions across the region, forced more than 2,000 flights to be canceled, and left tens of thousands of people without power. The Colorado Avalanche Information Center issued an avalanche warning for the Front Range area due to the heavy snow. The Aurora Police Department in Colorado reported 25 to 30 vehicles were stranded on the E-470 toll road east of Denver. Several interstate highways including Interstate 25, Interstate 70, Interstate 76 and Interstate 80 shut down. Nearly 24,000 homes and businesses in Colorado remained without electricity on March 15.  Several school districts in South Dakota canceled classes due to the storm. In Wyoming, schools in Laramie and Natrona counties announced they would be closed through the middle of the week as travel was nearly impossible. The United States Postal Service also announced it is having difficulty delivering mail in some parts of Wyoming. Outside of those two states, wind gusts reaching  in Maeser, Utah.

Midwest 

In Minnesota, the State Patrol said 264 crashes were reported, and 22 of those involved injuries. At least 13 tractor-trailers jackknifed and 251 vehicles spun out on the slick roadways.

Southern Plains
Multiple tornadoes touched down across the Panhandle, mainly areas between Lubbock and Amarillo and points eastward. A large tornado prompted PDS tornado warnings for portions of Randall, Armstrong, and Carson counties. After surveys, it was determined an EF2 tornado moved from southwest of Happy in Swisher County to east of Canyon in Randall County. As the tornado dissipated, a new tornado, rated EF1, formed and moved into Armstrong County, passing over Palo Duro Canyon. A third tornado was spawned just northeast of the second one, also crossing from Randall to Armstrong and lifting near Washburn, just before crossing into Carson County. Another EF2 tornado caused minor damage in Clarendon before strengthening and causing major damage near the Greenbelt Lake Reservoir. The final tornado of the day was a EF2 tornado that touched down southwest of Ensign and caused minor damage including several sturdy wood electrical poles that were snapped.<ref name= Damage totaled $1.285 million.

Confirmed tornadoes

See also

 List of North American tornadoes and tornado outbreaks
 List of tornadoes with confirmed satellite tornadoes
 April 2016 North American storm complex
 Tornado outbreak and floods of April 28 – May 1, 2017
 Tornado outbreak and blizzard of April 13–15, 2018
 Late November 2020 North American storm complex

Notes

References

External links

 Archive of Storm Summaries from the Weather Prediction Center

2020–21 North American winter
2021 natural disasters in the United States
Blizzards in the United States
March 2021 events in North America
Tornadoes of 2021
Blizzards
F2 tornadoes
Tornadoes in Texas
Natural disasters in Texas
Extratropical cyclones
2021 natural disasters
2021 meteorology
Satellite tornadoes